Deathstars is a Swedish industrial metal band from Strömstad. Formed in 2000, the group are noted for their dark horror-themed lyrics, pessimistic and misanthropic social commentary, distinctive trademark face paint, dark stage uniforms and physical appearances that correspond to gothic fashion. They have released four full-length studio albums; Synthetic Generation (2002 in Europe and 2003 in North and South America), Termination Bliss (2006), Night Electric Night (2009), and The Perfect Cult (2014). Deathstars have supported live acts by bands such as Korn and Cradle of Filth, the latter of which were part of the inspiration for Deathstars. Deathstars also supported Rammstein on their Made In Germany 1995–2011 tour.

The current lineup of the band consists primarily of members from Swordmaster, a black metal project that has former members of Dissection, and Ophthalamia. The band currently consists of lead guitarist Nightmare Industries, lead vocalist Whiplasher Bernadotte, bassist Skinny Disco, rhythm guitarist Cat Casino and drummer Nitro. The band normally uses standard C tuning, in which instruments are transposed two whole tones lower than standard tuning.

History

Formation, Synthetic Generation (2000–2003) 

The founding members of the band have known each other from childhood after growing up in Strömstad. The members have considered Deathstars to be a metamorphosed version of 1993 founded black metal act, Swordmaster, featuring former Dissection drummer Ole Öhman ("Bone W.a Machine") and guitarist Emil Nödtveidt ("Nightmare Industries"). Nightmare Industries was also the brother of Dissection's late Jon Nödtveidt. Deathstars is fronted by Andreas Bergh ("Whiplasher Bernadotte") and saw Erik Halvorsen ("Beast X Electric") on guitar. The band took on both a radical image and change in musical direction for the album Synthetic Generation.

According to Nightmare Industries in an interview, the name "Deathstars" itself was never intended to be a reference to the Death Star in Star Wars, but was in fact supposed to be an amalgamation of "Death Metal" and "Stars." They cite bands such as Kiss as an early inspiration, and have recently been compared to Rammstein, The Kovenant and Marilyn Manson.

Synthetic Generation first surfaced in Sweden during March 2002 on LED Recordings, but would be picked up for European release by the German Nuclear Blast label the following year.

Originally only a live bass player for Deathstars, Jonas Kangur ("Skinny Disco") became an official member on 1 October 2003.

Before Synthetic Generation was released, several demos were recorded, two of which are freely available on the internet; 'Razor End' and 'Black Medicine'. 'Razor End' is the most unusual as it is a song with strong female vocals, and is more like Synthetic Generation's material, whereas 'Black Medicine', can be described as featuring parts of 'The Last Ammunition', 'Tongues' and 'Blitzkrieg' from Termination Bliss. 'Black Medicine' may be linked to the song 'Tongues' as the song 'Tongues' describes "white medicine".

Termination Bliss, new lineup (2004–2006) 
Plans to commence recording of a second album in June 2004 were delayed as, returning home from an appearance at the Wave Gotik Treffen festival in Leipzig, Germany, Deathstars had over $15,000 worth of gear stolen from their tour bus. The band later landed the support to the resurrected Dissection at their Stockholm Lilla Arenan gig in late October.

Deathstars undertook album recordings in early 2005 at the band's own Black Syndicate Studios for the Termination Bliss album.

In outside activity, both Emil Nodtveidt and bassist Skinny scored production credits on the Dissection album Reinkaos. Deathstars also remixed the track "Vyperpunk" on Dope Stars Inc.'s Neuromance album.

The band parted ways with guitarist Erik Halvorsen in August, citing "lack of enthusiasm".

Termination Bliss saw release in January 2006. Limited edition variants added a "Driven On" remix of the track "Blitzkrieg" by Mortiis.

The band supported Cradle of Filth on their 2006 tour through Europe.

In September 2006 Deathstars' website announced that Eric Bäckman ("Cat Casino") was now a full-time guitarist for Deathstars.

Night Electric Night (2007–2012) 
In September 2007 Deathstars' website announced that they would open shows for Korn on their European tour throughout January and February 2008. Deathstars headlined a few shows on their own between the dates they performed with Korn. Later, it was announced that Bone W. Machine would not partake in the upcoming European tour with Korn due to personal reasons. Bernadotte attributed this to the fact that the drummer "had to take care of his family back home." Fellow Swede Adrian Erlandsson, who has also played the drums for Cradle of Filth, filled in on the drumming duties for the tour.

For the next upcoming studio album, Deathstars producer and guitarist, Nightmare Industries, wrote the song "Via the End" when he heard of the suicide of his brother, Jon Nödtveidt. Of the album, lead Deathstars vocalist Whiplasher said: "I am very pleased with how the songs illustrates our lives, because that's what it's all about – our everynight situations and the timeless sounds of the depraved city. I just wanted to combine serious personal issues, destructive city nighttime, naked bodies and the dark presence of Russia. It is the absolute Fort Knox of modern dark rock".

On 29 October 2007, Deathstars entered Metrosonic Recording Studios in New York City to begin the recording of their third studio album. The mixing was set for January 2008 with the album scheduled for release during Spring 2008. In a January 2008 interview, Bergh revealed that Deathstars' third studio album would be titled Deathglam. However, after Metallica releasing Death Magnetic, they soon changed the new album's name to Night Electric Night and jokingly stated that Deathstars themselves inspired the signature font and the track name 'Cyanide' on the Metallica album. Later on, Whiplasher revealed (also jokingly) that the new album will now be titled Master of Muppets (a play on the famed Metallica album, Master of Puppets).

Also, in May 2008, Nuclear Blast released an ultimate edition of the band's second album Termination Bliss called Termination Bliss Extended containing a CD and DVD. This contains one bonus track, "Termination Bliss (Piano Version)", but does not include "Blitzkrieg (Driven On Version)". The special DVD includes all the music videos and special "making of" them. They have also released a single DVD entitled "Termination Bliss EXTENSION".

On 7 November 2008, Deathstars announced on their official Myspace page the full track listing of the newest album, its release date as 30 January 2009, and the first single, 'Death Dies Hard' would be aired on Bandit Rock 106.3 Stockholm. The following day, the artwork for the standard edition cover was also released.

On their official webpage Deathstars announced on 31 January '09 that they would be completing the second leg of their European tour in the UK and announced the dates at 15 different locations to happen in April '09.

On 10 March, there was news on the "attack on America". On the Deathstars official webpage, it was announced that they had signed with Bieler Bros Records. On 19 May, Night Electric Night was slated to be released in the US with accompanying tour dates to follow. Deathstars have yet to announce any tour plans in North America in support of Night Electric Night.

Throughout 2010, Deathstars continued touring Europe to support Night Electric Night, and in late May 2010 Deathstars played four shows in South America. Later the band would re-release Night Electric Night as a two CD and DVD set, with the second CD containing remixes and two unreleased songs.

On 25 August 2011, Rammstein's official website announced they will play as supporting act on their "Made in Germany 2011–2012 European Tour".

On 24 October 2011 via their official Facebook page, Deathstars announced Oscar Leander, AKA Vice, as their new drummer following the departure of Bone W. Machine. They also announced that the video for the new single "Metal" would premier on 4 November 2011.

In 2012, Skinny Kangur and Cat Casino toured with the American glam metal band Vain.

The Perfect Cult and lineup change (2013–2017) 

The band announced on their official website that recording for the next album will begin in July 2013. Deathstars have also parted ways with guitarist Cat Casino, who wanted to "focus on other things in life but death." The band stated that they will continue as a four-piece for now and Skinny Disco said they will not look for a replacement because it is "hard to replace Cat on a personal level", but that they also remain close friends.

The upcoming release has been recorded in several studios: drums, guitars and bass were recorded in Bohus Sound Recording, Kungälv, Sweden, vocals in Gig Studios in Stockholm, Sweden and keyboards, orchestration and editing was done in Black Syndicate, Stockholm. While the mixing, as usual, was handled by legendary Stefan Glaumann (Rammstein, Within Temptation), guitarist/keyboardist Nightmare acted as record producer as he has done on previous records. For the drum, guitar and bass production, Nightmare worked together with Roberto Laghi (Entombed, In Flames) at Bohus Sound Recording. The album was mastered by Svante Forsbäck (Volbeat, Rammstein) at Chartmakers, Helsinki, Finland.

Lyrically, vocalist Whiplasher states that "all the tracks are about our lives. Each song is a reflection on a situation or a topic that deals with our experiences, usually from a jet black perspective. With visions inspired by amoral excessive lives, human fears and decay, the songs will be nothing less than a dark playground set between straight forward tracks, atmospheric anthems and the unwashed loins of lawless rock."

Announced on the band's official website on 11 March 2014 the 4th studio album is entitled The Perfect Cult. The band released an album trailer on YouTube where it was revealed that the new album will be released on 13 June 2014 in Europe, 16 June in the UK, and 24 June in the United States through Nuclear Blast Records. This will be followed by a European tour that would span from late September through to early November.

Departure of Vice, reuniting with Cat, and Everything Destroys You (2017–present) 
Deathstars announced on 21 June 2017 that longtime drummer, Oscar "Vice" Leander, would be leaving the band after 9 years playing with Deathstars and 6 years as an official member. Vice toured with the band for their July 2017 shows in Mexico before making his leave official and joined Tribulation.

The tour, however, was later postponed. The band also confirmed that they were working on a new album to be released "as soon as possible".

The band performed a string of festivals across the summer of 2019, including Graspop Metal Meeting, Wacken Open Air, and M'era Luna Festival.

The band announced that Cat Casino reunited with Deathstars whilst confirming that they are in the studio working on their 5th album and was originally due for release in late 2020, however this did not happen due to unforeseen circumstances and relations to the Coronavirus pandemic.  In January 2023, it was eventually officially announced that their 5th studio album, titled ‘Everything Destroys You’, will be released on 5 May 2023.  This will mark their longest ever gap between studio albums with it being their first new release in 9 years since 2014’s ‘The Perfect Cult’.

Acclaim 
In 2007, Metal Hammer Magazine presented Deathstars with the Best Newcomers Award at the Golden Gods Awards. The same year the band also won the "Champions Belt" at the Get In The Ring Contest at the Hammersmith Apollo in London. On the "Lords of Metal" review website, Deathstar's album Night Electric Night was given a rating of 84%.

Band members 
Current members
 Emil "Nightmare Industries" Nödtveidt – lead guitar, keyboards (2000–present), bass (2000–2003)
 Andreas "Whiplasher Bernadotte" Bergh – lead vocals (2000–present)
 Jonas "Skinny Disco" Kangur – bass, backing vocals (2003–present)
 Eric "Cat Casino" Bäckman – rhythm guitar (2006–2013, 2019–present)
 Marcus "Nitro" Johansson – drums (2019–present)

Former members
 Erik "Beast X Electric" Halvorsen – rhythm guitar (2000–2005)
 Ole "Bone W. Machine" Öhman – drums (2000–2011)
 Oscar "Vice" Leander – drums (2011–2017)

Timeline

Discography 
Albums
 Synthetic Generation (2002)
 Termination Bliss (2006)
 Night Electric Night (2009)
 The Perfect Cult (2014)
 Everything Destroys You (2023)

Compilations
 Decade of Debauchery (2010)
 The Greatest Hits on Earth (2011)

Videography 
 "Synthetic Generation" (2000)
 "Syndrome" (2002)
 "Cyanide" (2005)
 "Blitzkrieg" (2006)
 "Virtue to Vice" (2007)
 "Death Dies Hard" (2009)
 "Metal" (2011)
 "All the Devil's Toys" (2014)
 "This Is" (2023)
 "Midnight Party" (2023)

References

External links 
 

2000 establishments in Sweden
Industrial metal musical groups
Musical groups established in 2000
Musical quintets
Nuclear Blast artists
Swedish heavy metal musical groups
Swedish gothic metal musical groups